KULA-LP (95.1 FM) is a radio station licensed to serve Ili'ili, American Samoa. The station is owned by Pacific Islands Bible School. It airs a Religious radio format.

The station was assigned the KULA-LP call letters by the Federal Communications Commission on September 9, 2002.

Translators

References

External links
 

Low-power FM radio stations in the United States
ULA-LP
2004 establishments in American Samoa
Radio stations established in 2004
Tutuila